E-Arsenal was an Estonian arms manufacturing company operating in Tallinn from 1994 to 2012.

History 
In 1910, the electromechanic company Russian Admiralty Arsenal (Estonian: Vene Admiraliteedi Arsenal) was founded.

In 1920, the company was renamed to Arsenal. After the Second World War, Arsenal factories housed a Soviet weapons factory. Aleksander Silberg became the head of Arsenal until 1925.

In 1926, the Arsenal Submachine gun was designed and produced by Arsenal. The Arsenal Crossley (M 27/28) armored car was produced from 1926 to 1928, the engines being produced by Crossley Motors, and 13 being assembled in the Arsenal factory and used in the Estonian Army.

From 1994 to 2009, a new state-owned company was founded on the foundations of Arsenal, and the company was owned by the Ministry of Defense. In 2009, the company was renamed E-Arsenal. 

In 2012, the Ministry of Defense liquidated E-Arsenal.

Legacy 

A shopping center,  (Estonian: Arsenali Keskus), was opened in Põhja-Tallinn on Erika Street in 2016, in the former Arsenal building.

References 

Companies based in Tallinn
Military of Estonia